Zinc cyanide is the inorganic compound with the formula Zn(CN)2. It is a white solid that is used mainly for electroplating zinc but also has more specialized applications for the synthesis of organic compounds.

Structure
In Zn(CN)2, zinc adopts the tetrahedral coordination environment, all linked by bridging cyanide ligands. The structure consists of two "interpenetrating" structures (blue and red in the picture above).  Such motifs are sometimes called "expanded  diamondoid" structures. Some forms of SiO2 adopt a similar structure, wherein the tetrahedral Si centres are linked by oxides. The cyanide group shows head to tail disorder with any zinc atom having between one and four carbon neighbours, and the remaining being nitrogen atoms. It shows one of the largest negative coefficients of thermal expansion (exceeding the previous record holder, zirconium tungstate).

Chemical properties
Typical for an inorganic polymer, Zn(CN)2 is insoluble in most solvents. The solid dissolves in, or more precisely, is degraded by, aqueous solutions of basic ligands such as hydroxide, ammonia, and additional cyanide to give anionic complexes.

Synthesis
Zn(CN)2 is easy to make by combining aqueous solutions of cyanide and zinc ions, for example via the double replacement reaction between KCN and ZnSO4:
 ZnSO4 + 2 KCN → Zn(CN)2 + K2SO4

For commercial applications, some effort is made to avoid halide impurities by using acetate salts of zinc:
 Zn(CH3COO)2 + HCN → Zn(CN)2 + 2 CH3COOH

Zinc cyanide is also produced as a byproduct of certain gold extraction methods. Procedures to isolate gold from aqueous gold cyanide sometimes call for the addition of zinc:
 2 [Au(CN)2]−  +  Zn   →   2 Au  +  Zn(CN)2  +  2 CN−

Applications

Electroplating
The main application of Zn(CN)2 is for electroplating of zinc from aqueous solutions containing additional cyanide.

Organic synthesis
Zn(CN)2 is used to introduce the formyl group in to aromatic compounds in the Gatterman reaction where it serves a convenient, safer, and non-gaseous alternative to HCN. Because the reaction uses HCl, Zn(CN)2 also supplies the reaction in situ with ZnCl2, a Lewis acid catalyst. Examples of Zn(CN)2 being used in this way include the synthesis of 2-hydroxy-1-naphthaldehyde and mesitaldehyde.

Zn(CN)2 is also employed as a catalyst for the cyanosilylation of aldehydes and ketones.

References

zinc
cyanide